The 2022 season was the Cleveland Browns' 70th in the National Football League (NFL), their 74th overall, and their third under the head coach/general manager tandem of Kevin Stefanski and Andrew Berry. The Browns failed to improve upon their 8–9 record from the previous season as they finished 7–10. The Browns failed to qualify for the playoffs for the second straight season The Browns introduced a new midfield logo, with Brownie the Elf; this is their first season with a new midfield logo since 2016.

On March 18, the Browns acquired quarterback Deshaun Watson from the Houston Texans in exchange for six draft selections including three first-round picks. Former starting quarterback Baker Mayfield was later dealt to the Carolina Panthers. Due to Watson's 11-game suspension levied as a result of several sexual assault accusations and lawsuits stemming from his time in Houston, the Browns started backup Jacoby Brissett for the games that Watson was forced to miss. The team posted a 4–7 record under Brissett before Watson made his debut in Week 13.

Offseason

Re-signings

Signings

Players lost

Trades
The Browns made the following trades involving players during the 2022 offseason.

Draft

Draft trades

Undrafted free agents

Staff

Final roster

Preseason

Regular season

Schedule

Note: Intra-division opponents are in bold text.

Game summaries

Week 1: at Carolina Panthers

The Browns opened their season with a trip to Charlotte to play the Carolina Panthers, led by former Browns quarterback Baker Mayfield.  The Browns jumped out to a 20–7 lead, however Carolina scored two touchdowns and a field goal in the final frame to take a 24–23 lead with 1:13 remaining in the game.  The Browns, led by backup quarterback Jacoby Brissett, drove to the Carolina 40-yard line, where rookie kicker Cade York hit a 58–yard field goal to give the Browns a 26–24 win.

With the win, the Browns started the season 1–0, the first season opening win since 2004, ending a 17-game winless streak in Week 1. York was named AFC Special Teams Player of the week. York connected on four field goals, including a 58–yard game-winner. This set the NFL record for the longest field goal by a rookie in his team's first game.

Week 2: vs. New York Jets

The Browns opened the home portion of their schedule against the New York Jets, looking for their first 2–0 start since 1993.  The Browns built a 30–17 lead with just under 2:00 remaining in the game on the strength of three Nick Chubb touchdown runs.  However, New York scored two quick touchdowns with a successful onside kick in between to take a surprising 31–30 win.

With the loss, the Browns fell to 1–1.

Week 3: vs. Pittsburgh Steelers

After a tough loss, the Browns stayed home to take on the rival Pittsburgh Steelers on a very windy Thursday night.  Both teams scored two touchdowns in the first half, but a missed extra point by Cade York gave the Steelers a 14–13 lead heading into halftime.  The Browns took a 16–14 lead on a York field goal in the third quarter and extended it to 23–14 on a Nick Chubb touchdown run, but a Chris Boswell field goal cut the Browns' lead to six points with 1:48 remaining.  Unable to run the clock out, the Browns punted the ball to the Pittsburgh 4-yard line with nine seconds remaining.  However, an unsuccessful hook-and-latter play by was fumbled by Pittsburgh and recovered by Browns' CB Denzel Ward in the end zone to make the final score 29–17.
  
With the win, the Browns improved to 2–1.

Week 4: at Atlanta Falcons

The Browns traveled to Atlanta to take on the Falcons.  Atlanta opened a 10–0 lead in the first quarter on a Younghoe Koo field goal and a Cordarrelle Patterson touchdown run.  However Cleveland answered with a Jacoby Brissett touchdown run and a Cade York field goal to tie the game 10–10 at halftime.  York added another field goal to give the Browns a 13–10. The two teams traded touchdowns, giving the Browns a 20–17 lead after three quarters.  Koo booted a pair of field goals in the fourth quarter to give the Falcons a 23–20 win.

With the loss, the Browns fell to 2–2.

Week 5: vs. Los Angeles Chargers

The Browns returned home to take on the Los Angeles Chargers after a tough loss in Atlanta.  Cleveland took a 7–0 lead five plays into the game when Nick Chubb broke numerous tackles on a 41-yard touchdown run, and doubled their lead on a Jacoby Brissett touchdown pass to Amari Cooper.  However, Los Angeles scored the next 17 points on a Taylor Bertolet field goal and two touchdowns on a Joshua Kelley run and a Justin Herbert pass to Austin Ekeler. Cleveland retook the lead with Chubb's second touchdown run, making the score 21–17 at halftime

On the opening drive of the second half, Herbert and Williams connected for 21 yards to convert a 3rd and 12, leading to an Ekeler touchdown run as the Chargers retook the lead at 24–21. Soon afterwards, Cleveland went for it on 4th and 1 from their own 34, but Kareem Hunt was tackled for a loss, setting up another Bertolet field goal. Hunt scored on Cleveland's next drive, putting Cleveland up 28–27 late in the 3rd quarter. Runs of 16 yards by Ekeler and 17 yards by Kelley then helped the Chargers drive inside Cleveland's 10, where they had to settle for their third short field goal of the game to take a 30–28 lead. 

Late in the game, the Chargers went for 4th and 2 yards required with 1:14 remaining. A conversion would have allowed Los Angeles to run out the clock However, Herbert's pass to was broken up and the Browns took over at the Los Angeles 45. Brissett managed a 10-yard completion, but could move the ball no closer, and York's 54-yard kick missed narrowly to the right with 11 seconds to play.  

With the loss the Browns fell to 2–3.

Week 6: vs. New England Patriots

The Browns stayed home to take on the New England Patriots.  New England was led by rookie backup quarterback Bailey Zappe due to an injury to starter Mac Jones. After the teams traded field goals in the first quarter, New England scored the game's first touchdown on a Rhamondre Stevenson 31-yard run.  Cade York added his second field goal of the game late in the second quarter, giving New England a 10–6 halftime lead.

New England broke away with two Zappe touchdown passes in the third quarter to build their lead to 24–6.  Cleveland then closed New England's lead to 24–15 with a York field goal and Jacoby Brissett touchdown pass to Amari Cooper with just over six minutes remaining.  However, a failed onside kick and a Brissett interception led to two New England touchdowns, making the final score 38–15.

With the loss, the Browns fell to 2–4.  During the game, DE Myles Garrett set the franchise record for most career sacks with 62.5, breaking the mark of 62 previously held by Clay Matthews.

Week 7: at Baltimore Ravens

The Browns traveled to Baltimore for their first meeting with the division rival Baltimore Ravens, looking to avoid a fourth straight loss.  The Browns opened the scoring with a Nick Chubb touchdown run.  After the two teams swapped field goals, the Browns held a 10–3 lead after one quarter.  However, Baltimore scored the next 17 points on a Justin Tucker field goal and a pair of Gus Edwards touchdown runs to build a 20–10 lead.  

The teams again traded field goals and Kareem Hunt added a touchdown run to close the Ravens' lead to 23–20 with nine minutes remaining.  Just before the two-minute warning, York attempted a potential game-tying 60-yard field goal, but it was blocked.  The Browns got the ball back with 16 seconds remaining, but a failed hook-and-ladder ended the game.

With the loss, the Browns fell to 2–5.  This marked the Browns' first four-game losing streak since 2019.

Week 8: vs. Cincinnati Bengals

The Browns returned home to take on the Cincinnati Bengals in the first round of this season's Battle of Ohio.

After a scoreles first quarter, Nick Chubb got the Browns on the board with a 3-yard touchdown run (and successful two-point conversion).  A Cade York 55-yard field goal closed out an otherwise quiet first half with the Browns holding an 11–0 lead.  The Browns expanded their lead to 25–0 in the third quarter on a Jacoby Brissett touchdown run and a Brissett touchdown pass to Amari Cooper. Cincinnati finally got on the board in the fourth quarter with a pair of Joe Burrow touchdown passes sandwiching Chubb's second touchdown run, but the Browns were able to win comfortably, 32–13. 

With the win, the Browns entered their bye week at 3–5.  This marked the Browns' fifth straight win over the Bengals, their longest winning streak in the series since a seven-game winning streak from 1992–1995.

Week 10: at Miami Dolphins

The Browns returned from their bye week with an away game against the Miami Dolphins, marking the return of quarterback Jacoby Brissett to Miami, where he played for the Dolphins the previous season.  

The Browns scored on their opening drive with a Brissett touchdown pass to Harrison Bryant to take a 7–0 lead.  However, Miami would score the next 24 points of the game on a pair of Tua Tagovailoa touchdown passes, a Raheem Mostert touchdown run, and a Jason Sanders field goal, taking a 24–7 lead early in the third quarter.  The Browns moved the score to 30–17 on a Cade York field goal and a Nick Chubb 33-yard touchdown run sandwiching Tagovailoa's third touchdown pass of the day, however Miami put the game away in the fourth quarter with another field foal and a Jeff Wilson touchdown run, making the final score 39–17.

With the loss, the Browns fell to 3–6.

Week 11: at Buffalo Bills

Week 12: vs. Tampa Bay Buccaneers

Week 13: at Houston Texans

Deshaun Watson made his first start for the Browns against his former team in the Texans, returning after completing his suspension. Despite a lackluster performance from Watson and the offense as a whole, the Browns still won handily 27–14 thanks to two defensive touchdowns and a punt return touchdown.

Week 14: at Cincinnati Bengals

Week 15: vs. Baltimore Ravens

With the win, the Browns improved to 6–8.  This marked the Browns' 500th win as a member of the NFL.

Week 16: vs. New Orleans Saints

With the loss, the Browns fell to 6–9 and were eliminated from playoff contention.  The Browns finished 4–4 at home.

Week 17: at Washington Commanders

Coming off a tough loss and playoff elimination, the Browns visited the Washington Commanders.  Cleveland opened the scoring on a Cade York 37-yard field goal.  In the second quarter, Washington went on a 21-play, 96-yard drive culminating in a Carson Wentz touchdown run.  The Browns took control in the third quarter as Deshaun Watson threw touchdown passes to Amari Cooper and Donovan Peoples-Jones to take a 17–7 lead.  A Joey Slye field goal for Washington cut the lead to 17–10, but Cleveland responded with another touchdown pass from Watson to Cooper to extend their lead to 24–10, which would be the final score.

With the win, the Browns improved to 7–9. Punter Corey Bojorquez was named the AFC Special Teams Player of the Week after making four punts for 187 yards (46.8 avg.), including two punts downed within the Washington 5-yard line.

Week 18: at Pittsburgh Steelers

The Browns finished the season with a trip to Pittsburgh, hoping to sweep the Steelers for the first time since .  The Steelers entered the game with distant playoff hopes, but would need a win and multiple other teams in the playoff hunt to lose their games.

After a scoreless first quarter, the Browns struck first when Deshaun Watson found David Njoku on a 10-yard touchdown pass to make it 7–0. However, Pittsburgh would score the next 20 points in the game on a Kenny Pickett touchdown pass to George Pickens, a pair of Chris Boswell field goals, and a Najee Harris touchdown run to take a 20–7 lead.  The Browns closed the gap to one score at 20–14 on a Watson touchdown pass to Nick Chubb, but could not come any closer.  A late Pittsburgh touchdown made the final score 28–14.

With the loss, the Browns finished the season 7–10.  This marked the Browns' 19th straight regular-season loss in Pittsburgh.  The Browns finished 3–6 in away games.

Standings

Division

Conference

Team leaders

Regular season

Notes

References

External links
 

Cleveland
Cleveland Browns seasons
Cleveland Browns